Philip Edward Berger (born August 8, 1952) is a Republican member of the North Carolina General Assembly representing the state's thirtieth Senate district, which includes Caswell, Rockingham, Stokes, and Surry counties.

An attorney born in New York, Berger was first elected to the North Carolina Senate in 2000. He became minority  leader in 2004, and in 2010, he was selected by his fellow Republicans as their choice for the next Senate President Pro Tem. Berger was officially elected president Pro Tem when the legislature opened on January 26, 2011.

Berger supported voter ID legislation that a federal appeals court found to have targeted "African-Americans with almost surgical precision." Berger has contested the decision as politically motivated.

Early life and education 
Berger was born in New Rochelle, New York; he graduated from George Washington High School in Danville, Virginia in 1970 and studied briefly at Danville Community College. Berger earned a bachelor's degree in sociology from Averett College in 1980 and a J.D. degree from Wake Forest University School of Law in 1982, after which he entered law practice.

Voting rights

Voter ID laws 
In 2016, Berger supported voter ID legislation.  The Fourth Circuit Court of Appeals deemed the laws to "target African Americans with almost surgical precision in an opinion was written by Diana Motz. Berger criticized the ruling as a "decision by three partisan Democrats." The three judges working on the case were appointed by Democratic Presidents; however, only two have been directly associated with the Democratic party.

In 2017, the Supreme Court chose not to take up the case, allowing the lower court's decision to stand.

In 2018, a referendum for a Constitutional amendment was approved by a majority of voters. Berger voted to pass legislation that would enroll the amendment later in the year during a lame-duck session.

In 2019, a North Carolina judge offered an opinion that the General Assembly was illegally constituted and unable to make law. However, the Governor did enroll the amendment and it remains a portion of the Constitution. Further court proceedings are underway.

COVID-19 pandemic
During the COVID-19 pandemic, Berger led Republican opposition to North Carolina Board of Elections recommendations to make voting by mail easier.

Personal life 
He is married to Patricia Hays; they have three children, Philip Jr., Kevin, and Ashley as well as four grandchildren.

References

 http://www.charlotteobserver.com/news/politics-government/article68401147.html
 http://wunc.org/post/sifting-through-facts-house-bill-2#stream/0
 http://www.bizjournals.com/charlotte/blog/outside_the_loop/2016/04/red-ventures-reconsiders-staff-up-at-charlotte.html 
 http://www.bizjournals.com/charlotte/blog/outside_the_loop/2016/04/red-ventures-reconsiders-staff-up-at-charlotte.html
 http://www.newsobserver.com/news/politics-government/politics-columns-blogs/under-the-dome/article68797392.html
 http://www.newsobserver.com/sports/spt-columns-blogs/luke-decock/article69320567.html NCAA basketball tournament
 https://web.archive.org/web/20160331095445/http://press.highpointmarket.org/market-press-releases/300 statement
 https://web.archive.org/web/20170207020036/http://www.cggc.duke.edu/pdfs/2013-09-30HighPointMarket-economic-impact-analysis-1.pdf

|-

|-

|-

|-

|-

1952 births
21st-century American politicians
Averett University alumni
Lawyers from New Rochelle, New York
Living people
Republican Party North Carolina state senators
People from Rockingham County, North Carolina
Politicians from New Rochelle, New York
Wake Forest University alumni